Neocicada hieroglyphica, the hieroglyphic cicada, is a species of cicada in the family Cicadidae. It is found in Central America and North America.

Subspecies
These two subspecies belong to  N. hieroglyphica:
 N. h. hieroglyphica (Say, 1830) i
 N. h. johannis (Walker, 1850) i c g
Data sources: i = ITIS, c = Catalogue of Life, g = GBIF, b = Bugguide.net

References

Further reading

External links

 

Articles created by Qbugbot
Insects described in 1830
Leptopsaltriini